Adelaide (Aelis) of Tours ( 820 – c. 866) was a daughter of Count Hugh of Tours and his wife Ava, who was a sister of Matfrid, Count of Orléans. 

She married Conrad I, Count of Auxerre, with whom she had at least two children, Hugh and Conrad the Younger. Additionally legend of the later Swabian branch of the House of Welf assigns to Conrad and Adelaide an additional son, Welf I, a relationship considered probable. 

After her husband's death around 864, she married Robert the Strong, and had two children, Odo and Robert I of France. 

Robert I's grandson was Hugh Capet, the first king of the House of Capet.

Notes

References

820s births
866 deaths
Women from the Carolingian Empire
Nobility of the Carolingian Empire